Marcela Navarro Quintana (born 28 May 1959) is a Mexican architect and politician affiliated with the National Action Party. As of 2014 she served as Senator of the LIX Legislature of the Mexican Congress representing Tamaulipas as replacement of Gustavo Cárdenas Gutiérrez.

References

1959 births
Living people
People from Tampico, Tamaulipas
Mexican architects
Women members of the Senate of the Republic (Mexico)
Members of the Senate of the Republic (Mexico)
National Action Party (Mexico) politicians
21st-century Mexican women politicians
21st-century Mexican politicians
Autonomous University of Tamaulipas alumni